Artem Andriyovych Vovkun (born 7 September 2001) is a professional Ukrainian footballer who currently plays for FC Lviv as a defender.

Club career

MFK Zemplín Michalovce
Vovkun made his Fortuna Liga debut for Zemplín Michalovce against Spartak Trnava on 8 August 2020.

References

External links
 MFK Zemplín Michalovce official club profile 
 
 UPL profile
 
 Futbalnet profile 

2001 births
Living people
Sportspeople from Lviv
Ukrainian footballers
Ukrainian expatriate footballers
Association football defenders
MFK Zemplín Michalovce players
Slovak Super Liga players
Ukrainian Premier League players
Ukrainian Second League players
Expatriate footballers in Slovakia
Ukrainian expatriate sportspeople in Slovakia
MFA Mukachevo players
FC Lviv players